The Kasson Municipal Building, also known as Old City Hall, is a historic building located on Main Street in Kasson, Minnesota, United States.  Built in 1917, it was designed by Purcell & Elmslie in the Prairie School style.  It was listed on the National Register of Historic Places in 1982.  In 2005, a printing and copying business began operating in the building.

References

Buildings and structures in Dodge County, Minnesota
Government buildings completed in 1917
City and town halls on the National Register of Historic Places in Minnesota
Prairie School architecture in Minnesota
Purcell and Elmslie buildings
National Register of Historic Places in Dodge County, Minnesota
City and town halls in Minnesota